Mariam Mahamat Nour is a politician and economist in the Republic of Chad.

Nour has been Secretary General of the Government and minister responsible for relations with parliament since May 7, 2018.

Honors 
 Déco Officière de l'ordre national du Mérite (France, 2019)

References

Chadian politicians
Year of birth missing (living people)